Andrzej Owczarek (21 June 1950 – 6 November 2020) was a Polish politician.

Biography
He served as a Senator from 2005–2015 for the Civic Platform.

Owczarek died of COVID-19 in Łódź, Poland, on 6 November 2020, at the age of 70.

References

1950 births
2020 deaths
21st-century Polish politicians
People from Pabianice
Deaths from the COVID-19 pandemic in Poland
Members of the Senate of Poland 2005–2007
Members of the Senate of Poland 2007–2011
Members of the Senate of Poland 2011–2015
Mayors of places in Poland
University of Łódź alumni
Civic Platform politicians